Moldova Center is a mixed-use building, with a total leasable area of ​​over 16,900 square meters, combining the office area with the commercial one. The concept amplifies the well-being of employees in office spaces and all those who live in the area or visit the city center. The building has 6 floors with a typical area of ​​approximately 2400 sqm / floor. "

It is the ideal place designed to deliver exceptional growth in a quality environment, where companies in the IT&C and R&D industries can develop and inspire people. Moldova Center uses the most efficient technologies to keep the costs of use as low as possible and at the same time to keep up with the most applied “green” development trends.

On the ground floor there is a generous retail area, with supermarket, bank, confectionery and various services.

In 2006, it was enlarged and renamed Moldova Mall. With  gross leasable area (GLA), the complex had 80 stores, 3 cinema screens, and 14 fast-food and restaurants.

References

External links
 Moldova Center Website

Shopping malls in Iași